Edward Trotter may refer to:
 Edward Henry Trotter (1872–1916), British Army officer
 Edward Trotter (priest) (1842–1920), Anglican archdeacon
 Edward Kitchener Trotter, a character from Only Fools and Horses known as Grandad